See for Yourself is a Canadian children's television series which aired on CBC Television from 1959 to 1960.

Premise
This series featured arts, crafts, music, and various other subject matter presented for children. It was hosted by Ross Snetsinger who also operated a puppet named Foster.

Scheduling
This half-hour series was broadcast on Thursdays at 4:30 p.m. (Eastern time) from 15 October 1959 to 31 March 1960.

References

External links
 

CBC Television original programming
1950s Canadian children's television series
1959 Canadian television series debuts
1960 Canadian television series endings
Black-and-white Canadian television shows
Canadian television shows featuring puppetry